Danson Mumu Kago (born 16 June 1994) is a Kenyan international footballer who plays for Posta Rangers, as a striker.

Career
Born in Thika, Kago has played club football for Posta Rangers, Sofapaka and Tusker.

He made his international debut for Kenya in 2014.

References

1994 births
Living people
Kenyan footballers
Kenya international footballers
Posta Rangers F.C. players
Sofapaka F.C. players
Tusker F.C. players
Kenyan Premier League players
Association football forwards
People from Kiambu County